Blue Ivy Carter (born January 7, 2012) is an American singer. She is the first-born daughter of musicians Beyoncé and Jay-Z. Two days after her birth, Time dubbed Carter "the most famous baby in the world." That same day, her vocals were featured on the song "Glory", by her father Jay-Z, which earned her a Guinness World Record for being the youngest person to have a charted song on any Billboard chart. She has been the subject of depictions in media, including impersonations on Saturday Night Live and RuPaul's Drag Race.

In 2020, she was featured on "Brown Skin Girl", a single by her mother Beyoncé, alongside Wizkid and Saint Jhn. The song won her accolades including an NAACP Image Award; the BET Her Award, making her the youngest winner of a BET Award; and a Grammy Award for Best Music Video for the same song, which earned her another Guinness World Record for being the youngest individually credited Grammy Award winner, and the second youngest overall.

Biography 

On August 28, 2011, Beyoncé's pregnancy was announced during her performance of "Love On Top" at the 2011 MTV Video Music Awards. She finished the performance by unbuttoning her blazer and rubbing her stomach to confirm the pregnancy. Blue Ivy Carter was born on January 7, 2012, to Beyoncé and Jay-Z at Lenox Hill Hospital in Manhattan, New York. CBS wrote Carter was "Arguably the world's most famous baby, aside from Prince George and North West", the eldest child of Kim Kardashian and Kanye West. Two days after her birth, Time dubbed Carter "the most famous baby in the world." Since her birth, her parents have "worked to secure trademarks of their daughter's name for everything, including books, shampoos, video games, and more." Beyoncé argued Carter is a "cultural icon" during the trademark process. Through her mother, Carter is a granddaughter of Tina Knowles and Mathew Knowles as well as a niece of singer Solange Knowles. Media attention has been focused on Carter from birth because of her famous parents and extended family. In 2018, Carter attended first grade at the Center for Early Education, a private school in West Hollywood, California.

Career 

Dubbed the "New Princess of Pop" by Rolling Stone, Carter was featured gurgling and crying on her father's single "Glory", a song released to celebrate her two days after her birth. Because of "Glory", Carter is the youngest person to ever chart on the Billboard charts.

In 2015, Carter appeared as part of the choir on the Coldplay song "Up&Up" from their album A Head Full of Dreams.

In 2020, Carter sang on the track "Brown Skin Girl", earning accolades and awards for the performance. She was the youngest recipient of a BET Award when she received the BET Her Award. She was also awarded the Soul Train Music Award for The Ashford & Simpson Songwriter's Award, as well as the prize for Outstanding Duo, Group or Collaboration at the 2020 NAACP Image Award ceremony.

In November 2020, Carter narrated Matthew A. Cherry's book Hair Love about an African American father doing his daughter's hair for the first time. Variety posited "there's a chance she could contend for a Grammy nomination for spoken word."

On January 21, 2023, Carter joined her mother onstage to sing "Brown Skin Girl" for the first time, as Beyoncé performed at a private show in Dubai.

Public image 

In 2012, Hvar, Croatia named Carter an honorary citizen. Before Carter's birth, her parents had visited the town, where Beyoncé had first considered naming her Blue Ivy.

In August 2014, Carter joined her father Jay-Z onstage at the MTV Video Music Awards, where they presented Beyoncé with the Michael Jackson Video Vanguard Award. Carter has continued to attend music award ceremonies with her parents, including the 2016 MTV Video Music Awards, where she made headlines for the cost of the clothing she wore.

In January 2020, just before Carter's eighth birthday, rapper Megan Thee Stallion posted photos to her Instagram and Twitter of her, Beyoncé, and Carter. Vanity Fair writer K. Austin Collins and Harper's Bazaar web editor Violet Lucca criticized Carter's physical appearance. Both apologized and deleted their posts after backlash.

Cultural depictions of Carter 

In February 2012, Saturday Night Live parodied a baby Carter being sung to by Justin Timberlake playing Bon Iver. In January 2013, Saturday Night Live aired a parody of Carter and Beyoncé, where Carter's crib was "lined with one of Diana Ross's finest wigs."

In 2018, Carter was the subject of an impersonation by drag queen The Vixen on the Snatch Game episode on Season 10 of RuPaul's Drag Race. Into stated the characterization rested on "brat... without pushing Blue into more nuanced territory."

Discography

Singles

Guest appearances

Filmography

Film

Music videos

Awards and nominations

References

External links 
 

2012 births
Living people
21st-century American women singers
African-American women singers
Beyoncé
Jay-Z
American child singers
Singers from New York City
Grammy Award winners
21st-century American singers
American people of Creole descent